Dmitry Tursunov and Ernests Gulbis were the defending champions, but chose not to participate.
Scott Lipsky and Rajeev Ram won in the final 6–3, 6–7(4–7), [12–10], against Rohan Bopanna and Kristof Vliegen.

Seeds

Draw

Draw

References
 Main Draw

Doubles